István is a Hungarian masculine name. It may also refer to:

 Miloslav Ištvan (1928–1990), Czech composer
 Norbert Bódis (born 1996), Romanian footballer
 Zoltan Istvan Gyurko (born 1973), American transhumanist, journalist, entrepreneur, political candidate and futurist
 István, a király, rock opera
 István Cave, a cave in Hungary

See also
 SMS Szent István, battleship named after Saint Stephen